"Give Me All Your Love" is a song by Whitesnake.

Give Me All Your Love or Gimme All Your Love may also refer to:
"Give Me All Your Love" (Magic Affair song), 1994
"Give Me All Your Love", a song by Alma Carroll that competed to represent Ireland in the Eurovision Song Contest 1968
"Give Me All Your Love", a song by Ari Gold from Ari Gold
"Give Me All Your Love", a song by The Continentals in the Island Records discography
"Give Me All Your Love", a song by Carl Cox
"Give Me All Your Love", a song by Exposé, B-side of the single "I'll Never Get Over You Getting Over Me"
"Gimme All Your Love", a song by Alabama Shakes, 2015
"Gimme All Your Love", a song by Alessandra Mirka Gatti recording as Sheela

See also
Give Me All Your Loving (disambiguation)